Cosmobunus is a genus of harvestmen in the family Sclerosomatidae from Spain and later Guatemala and Mexico.

Species
 Cosmobunus americanus Roewer, 1957
 Cosmobunus auratus C.J.Goodnight & M.L.Goodnight, 1946
 Cosmobunus granarius (Lucas, 1846)
 Cosmobunus unicolor Roewer, 1910
 Cosmobunus unifasciatus Roewer, 1923

References

Harvestmen